The 2004 Connecticut Democratic presidential primary was held on March 2 in the U.S. state of Connecticut as one of the Democratic Party's statewide nomination contests ahead of the 2004 presidential election.

Results

References

Connecticut
Democratic primary
2004